Tiefenbronn is a municipality in the Enz district of Baden-Württemberg, Germany.

History

Geography
The buntsandstein of the Röt Formation, under the Black Forest, extends into the municipal area from the west as far east as the border with Heimsheim. North and south of the buntsandstein are the wooded and karstified hills of muschelkalk of the Heckengäu. The main watercourse is the Würm, a tributary of the Enz that flows through Tiefenbronn in several meanders. The lowest elevation above sea level,  Normalnull (NN), is found where the Würm forms the border with Pforzheim. The highest elevation is  NN, on the northern slope of the Büchelberg.

Coat of arms
Tiefenbronn's coat of arms displays a golden well with the bucket drawn up on green ground upon a field of blue. This coat of arms was approved by the Federal Ministry of the Interior on 30 March 1966 again on 15 February 1979 by the Enz district office after the merging of Lehningen and Mühlhausen into Tiefenbronn in 1972.

References

Enzkreis
Baden